Robert Emil Maysack (November 25, 1872 – December 24, 1960) was an American gymnast and track and field athlete who competed in the 1904 Summer Olympics. He died in Highlands County, Florida.

In 1904 he won the bronze medal in the team event. He was also 55th in gymnastics' triathlon event, 59th in gymnastics' all-around competition and 70th in athletics' triathlon event.

References

External links
 profile

1872 births
1960 deaths
Athletes (track and field) at the 1904 Summer Olympics
Gymnasts at the 1904 Summer Olympics
Olympic track and field athletes of the United States
Olympic bronze medalists for the United States in gymnastics
American male artistic gymnasts
Medalists at the 1904 Summer Olympics
American male triathletes
19th-century American people
20th-century American people